The Dark Street is a 1944 thriller novel by the British writer Peter Cheyney. It was published in the United States by Dodd, Mead with the alternative title of The Dark Street Murders. It follows on from both the 1942 novel Dark Duet and the 1943 novel The Stars Are Dark and features his recurring head of British counter intelligence Quale as well as the spy Shaun O'Mara. It begins in wartime occupied Paris before moving to London.

References

Bibliography
 Panek, LeRoy. The Special Branch: The British Spy Novel, 1890-1980. Popular Press, 1981.
 Reilly, John M. Twentieth Century Crime & Mystery Writers. Springer, 2015.

1944 British novels
Novels by Peter Cheyney
British thriller novels
British spy novels
Novels set in London
Novels set in Paris
William Collins, Sons books
Novels set during World War II